FC Spartak-Telekom Shuya was a Russian football team from Shuya. It played professionally from 1998 to 2003. Their best result was 9th place in the Russian Second Division (Zone Center, 2000 and Zone West, 2002). In 2004 it merged into FC Tekstilshchik Ivanovo.

Team name history
 1991: FC Mashzavod Shuya
 1992–1995: FC Akvarius Shuya
 1996–2003: FC Spartak-Telekom Shuya.

External links
  Team history at KLISF

Association football clubs established in 1991
Association football clubs disestablished in 2004
Defunct football clubs in Russia
Sport in Ivanovo Oblast
1991 establishments in Russia
2004 disestablishments in Russia